Mehdiabad (also Romanized as Mehdīābād; also known as Khorramābād, Khurramābād, and Matiābād) is a village in Jaru Rural District, Palangabad District, Eshtehard County, Alborz Province, Iran. At the 2006 census, its population was 22, in 7 families.

References 

Populated places in Eshtehard County